Gauge is a light weight cross-platform test automation tool. It uses markdown to author test cases and scenarios. Its modular architecture makes it flexible and scalable.

Markdown
Gauge specifications are written in the business language. For example,

Find movies playing near me
===========================

The System Under Test in this example is a web application to find and book movie tickets

Search for movies
-----------------

* Specify location as "Bangalore"
* Search for movie "Star Wars"
* Verify that "INOX" is playing "Star Wars" at "7:30 pm"

Book movie ticket
-----------------

* Sign up with email address <user@example.com>
* Complete the verification
* Select location as "Bangalore", the movie "Star Wars" and "3" seats
* Confirm and pay
* Verify the "e-ticket" has been sent to the registered email.

This Gauge specification describes a feature of the System Under Test. The scenarios Search for movies and Book movie ticket represent a flow in this specification. Steps are executable parts of a specification.

Test Code
Specifications in Markdown abstracts code behind the steps.

For example, the step Specify location as "Bangalore" implementation in Java would look like

// This Method can be written in any java class as long as it is in classpath.

public class StepImplementation {
   @Step("Specify location as <location>")
   public void helloWorld(String location) {
       // Step implementation
   }
}

Gauge has Support for writing test code in:
 Java
 Ruby
 C#

The Community contributed language runners are:
 JavaScript
 Python
 Golang

Execution
Gauge tests can be executed from the command line or the supported IDEs.

The default command gauge specs run the tests sequentially.

The command gauge -p specs will execute the tests in Parallel.

Reports
Gauge gives comprehensive test reports that provides the required details of a given run.

IDE support
Gauge's IDE support helps to write and maintain the test suite.

References

External links

Free software testing tools
Cross-platform software
Free software programmed in Go
Software using the Apache license